The 2020–21 EuroLeague Women was the 63rd edition of the European women's club basketball championship organized by FIBA, and the 25th edition since being rebranded as the EuroLeague Women.

Team allocation
A total of 18 teams from 10 countries participated in the 2020–21 EuroLeague Women.

Teams
League positions of the previous season shown in parentheses:
Abd-: League positions of abandoned season due to the COVID-19 pandemic as determined by the leagues

Referees

Round and draw dates

Schedule

Draw
The draw was held on 17 August 2020 in Munich, Germany. The 16 teams were drawn into two groups of eight. For the draw, the teams were seeded into eight seeds.

The format of the competition was changed on 17 September 2020.

Qualifying round

|}

Regular season

The two top teams of each group will qualify to the quarterfinals.

If teams are level on record at the end of the Regular Season, tiebreakers are applied in the following order:
 Head-to-head record
 Head-to-head point differential
 Head-to-head points scored
 Point differential for the entire regular season
 Points scored for the entire regular season

Group A

Group B

Group C

Group D

Quarterfinals

|}

First leg

Second leg

Final Four

Bracket

Semifinals

Third place game

Final

Awards

EuroLeague MVP
 Alina Iagupova ( Fenerbahçe)

EuroLeague Final Four MVP
 Breanna Stewart ( (UMMC Ekaterinburg)

All-EuroLeague Teams

Defensive Player of the Year
  Gabby Williams ( Sopron Basket)

Young Player of the Year
  Iliana Rupert ( Tango Bourges Basket)

Coach of the Year
  Roberto Íñiguez ( Perfumerías Avenida)

Gameday MVP
Regular season

Quarterfinals

See also
 2020–21 EuroCup Women

References

External links
 

2020–21 in European women's basketball leagues
EuroLeague Women seasons